Eden Grove School was a residential special school in Bolton near the town of Appleby-in-Westmorland in Cumbria, England.

The school was opened in September 1955.

The school provided 52-week education and care for boys. Placements were long term and for up to 52 weeks a year, depending on individual need; 38-week placements were also available upon request.

The school closed in 2013.

References

 http://www.priorygroup.com/pg.asp?p=EdenGroveSchool1

External links
 Eden Grove School

Defunct schools in Cumbria
Educational institutions established in 1955
Educational institutions disestablished in 2013
1955 establishments in the United Kingdom
Defunct special schools in England
Bolton, Cumbria